The Tanzer 8.5 is a Canadian sailboat, that was designed by Johann Tanzer and first built in 1978.

Production
The boat was built by Tanzer Industries Limited in Dorion, Quebec. The company entered bankruptcy in 1986 and production had ended by then.

Design

The Tanzer 8.5 is a small recreational keelboat, built predominantly of fibreglass, with wood trim. It has a masthead sloop rig, a transom-hung rudder and a fixed fin keel. The boat displaces  and carries  of ballast.

It also has a fresh water tank of  capacity.

The boat has a PHRF racing average handicap of 201 with a high of 192 and low of 234.

Operational history
In a review Michael McGoldrick wrote, "The Tanzer 28 was replaced by the completely redesigned Tanzer 8.5 in 1979. Although both are 28 footers, the 8.5 is a nicer looking boat... The Tanzer 8.5 looks like a sleeker version of the Tanzer 26, and some of its cabin cushions and other components are interchangeable with the 26 foot model. Nevertheless, the 8.5 is a much larger boat inside and out, and comes with wide side decks and an inboard diesel engine. Its owners report that is also a fairly fast boat."

See also

List of sailing boat types

Similar sailboats
Aloha 28
Beneteau First 285
Beneteau Oceanis 281
Cal 28
Catalina 28
Grampian 28
O'Day 28
Pearson 28
Sabre 28
Sirius 28
Tanzer 28
TES 28 Magnam
Viking 28

References

External links

Keelboats
1970s sailboat type designs
Sailing yachts
Sailboat type designs by Johann Tanzer
Sailboat types built by Tanzer Industries